The John Woodman Memorial, otherwise known as the Wagga to Albury, is an annual bicycle handicap race that runs between the New South Wales cities of Wagga Wagga and Albury. The event was first run in the 1930s, leaving the Wagga Railway
Station and travelling via Tarcutta and Holbrook to finish outside the Globe Hotel in Albury. In 1948 the race was changed to run via the Olympic Way and finish in Dean St. It ran this way until its conclusion in 1963. In 1987 the event was revived and has run every year since.
The event is organised by the Albury Wodonga Cycling Club (AWCC) and for 2013, the race will be held on 28 July.

John Woodman
The race is named in honour of John Woodman, a talented Albury rider who turned professional in 1976, and 1986 join the Sydney base Gitane team. Winning a number of NSW & Victorian titles in his career, addition to riding in six Sun Tours. John was killed on 1 October 1986 whilst training for the upcoming Sun Tour.

Major results
1977
1st & Fastest – Lavington Open
4th – Cootamundra Annual
2nd – NSW Professional Road Title
1978
1st – NSW Professional Road Title
8th – Melbourne to Warrnambool
1979
1st – Tour of the North East
2nd – NSW Professional Road Title
1st – Open Road Title
1st & Fastest – Bathurst to Penrith
1980
2nd – Tour of the North East
Fastest Time – Griffith 100km Open
Fastest Time – Wangaratta '90'
1981
1st & Fastest – Sid Demmery Memorial Wagga
2nd – NSW Professional Road Title
1983
2 stage wins in the Sun Tour
1986
3rd – NSW Professional Road Title
3rd – Midlands Tour

The Race history
The first Wagga to Albury was held in the 1930s.  Leaving the Wagga Wagga railway station, the race travel east to Tarcutta, before travelling south through Holbrook to Albury, finish outside the Globe Hotel in Dean Street. In 1948 the race change to a shorter route via the Olympic Way to Albury.  The last of the original races was held in 1963.  Albury rider Jack Sommer won the fastest time.

The race was revived by then the Lavington Sports Club Cycling Club.  The first of the modern additions of race was held on 4 June 1986, with 96 entries rolling out from the car park of Tolland Hotel.  The first addition of the race was title Wagga to Albury Cycle Classic.  It was rename the John Woodman Memorial Cycle Classic a year later. Today its official name John Woodman Memorial Wagga Wagga to Albury Cycle Classic, is generally just known as Wagga to Albury.

Today it remains of one of the few city to city handicap races on the open calendar.

In 2010 the Albury Wodonga Cycling Club made the decision to stopping running the race due to the financial costs and other factors. The decision was later reversed.

The Course
Traditionally the race has started in front of the Tolland Hotel, Bourke Street, Wagga Wagga. In more recent times race has started from Jubilee Park on Holbrook Road due to traffic management issues. In 2010 the race started from Lloyd Road due to a clash with the Wagga Wagga Marathon, shortening the race by three kilometres.

The race travels through Mangoplah, Cookardina, Morven, Culcairn, Walla Walla, Jindera, before cresting the Jindera Gap and descending down to finish in front of the Lavington Hall, Urana Road Lavington.

Total Length: 135 km

In early years, the race finished in Albury's main street, Dean Street, in front of the Globe Hotel.

Past winners

Fastest Time

First Female

First Local (AWCC)

References
2011 John Woodman Memorial Flyer, published by the Albury Wodonga Cycling Club
John Woodman Memorial Wagga to Albury web site

External links
 Albury Wodonga Cycling Club
 Race route on Bikely
  Race route on Cycling Profiles
 Enter online at Cycling NSW
 Race route on Strava

Cycle races in Australia
Recurring sporting events established in 1987
Road bicycle races
1987 establishments in Australia